Robinson Creek may refer to:

Robinson Creek (Shelby Creek), a stream in Kentucky
Robinson Creek, Kentucky, an unincorporated community
Robinson Creek (Lake Ontario), a stream in Durham County, Ontario

See also
 Robinson Branch (disambiguation)